Hope railway station serves the village of Hope in Flintshire, Wales. The name of the station in Welsh is Yr Hob.

History
The station was originally known as Caergwrle, with the name changing to Hope Village on 1 January 1899, to differentiate it from Caergwrle and Hope Exchange stations, with the latter being just north of Penyffordd. The station had a 17-lever signal box at the northern end of the Wrexham-bound platform, with an adjacent third through line around the outside of the platform, and a goods yard with a cattle pen and one-ton crane. The signal box was opened in 1885 and closed on 1 August 1965, and the goods yard closed on 4 May 1964.  The station buildings here have been demolished since the station became unstaffed in 1969.

Facilities
Each of the two platforms has an electronic timetable (CIS screen), timetable poster board, a waiting shelter and CCTV. There is a cycle rack and lock-up on platform 1 and a payphone on platform 2. Entry to the station is by a ramp. Access to each platform is straightforward, with a pedestrian level crossing at the southern end of the platforms. However, neither platform has any seating.

Services
In the evenings and on bank holidays, this drops to one every second hour. There is a train every 90 minutes in each direction on Sundays.

References

Bibliography

External links

Railway stations in Flintshire
DfT Category F2 stations
Former Great Central Railway stations
Railway stations in Great Britain opened in 1866
Railway stations served by Transport for Wales Rail
1866 establishments in Wales